Claude Adhémar André Theuriet (8 October 1833 in Marly-le-Roi – 23 April 1907 in Bourg-la-Reine) was a 19th-century French poet and novelist.

Life
Theuriet was born at Marly-le-Roi (Seine et Oise), and was educated at Bar-le-Duc in his mother's province of Lorraine.

Theuriet studied law in Paris and joined the public service, attaining the rank of chef de bureau, before his retirement during 1886. He published during 1867 the Chemin des bois, a volume of poems, many of which had been published already in the Revue des Deux Mondes; Le bleu et le noir, poèmes de la vie réelle (1874), Nos oiseaux (1886), and other volumes followed.

M. Theuriet gives natural, simple description of rustic and especially of woodland life, and Théophile Gautier compared him to Shakespeare's Jaques of the forest of Arden. The best of his novels are those that deal with provincial and country life.
He died on 23 April 1907, and was succeeded at the Academy by Jean Richepin.

He was made a Chevalier de la Légion d'honneur during 1879, and was made an Officier de la Légion d'honneur during 1895.

His grandson André Theuriet became a versatile sportsman mostly known as an international rugby union player and swimmer.

Bibliography
 Le mariage de Gérard (1875)
 Raymonde (1877)
 Le fils Maugars (1879)
 La maison des Deux Barbeaux (1879)
 Sauvageonne (1880)
 Reine des bois (1890)
 Villa tranquille (1899)
 Le manuscrit du chanoine (1902)

References

Attribution:

External links

 
 
 

1833 births
1907 deaths
People from Marly-le-Roi
Members of the Académie Française
19th-century French poets
19th-century French dramatists and playwrights
Grand Officiers of the Légion d'honneur
French male poets
Members of the Ligue de la patrie française
19th-century French male writers